Scorpio Rising is a 1963 American experimental short film shot, edited, co-written and directed by Kenneth Anger, and starring Bruce Byron as Scorpio. Central themes include the occult, biker subculture, homosexuality, Christianity and Nazism. Scorpio Rising also explores the worship of rebel icons of the era, such as James Dean and Marlon Brando (referred to by Anger as Byron's "heroes"). Like many of Anger's films, Scorpio Rising does not contain any dialogue, but features a prominent soundtrack consisting of 1960s pop music, including songs by Ricky Nelson, The Angels, The Crystals, Bobby Vinton, Elvis Presley and Ray Charles.

In 2022, Scorpio Rising was selected for preservation in the United States National Film Registry by the Library of Congress as being "culturally, historically, or aesthetically significant".

Music
Scorpio Rising is considered by some to be the first drama film to feature a rock and roll soundtrack.

 Ricky Nelson – "Fools Rush In (Where Angels Fear to Tread)"
 Little Peggy March – "Wind-Up Doll"
 The Angels – "My Boyfriend's Back"
 Bobby Vinton – "Blue Velvet"
 Elvis Presley – "(You're the) Devil in Disguise"
 Ray Charles – "Hit the Road Jack"
 Martha and the Vandellas – "(Love Is Like a) Heat Wave"
 The Crystals – "He's a Rebel"
 Claudine Clark – "Party Lights"
 Kris Jensen – "Torture"
 Gene McDaniels – "Point of No Return"
 Little Peggy March – "I Will Follow Him"
 The Surfaris – "Wipe Out"

Release
The film premiered in October 1963 at the Gramercy Arts Theater in New York City.

At an art theater in Los Angeles, a screening was protested by the American Nazi Party on the basis that it insulted their flag. The police were ultimately called to the site and arrested the theater manager for public obscenity and canceled the film's run. The case went to the California Supreme Court, where the case was settled in Anger's favor. Anger explained in an interview:

Critical response
Scorpio Rising was praised by West Coast critics upon its initial release. When screened in New York City in 1964, Scorpio Rising garnered additional positive reviews from The New Yorker, Variety and Newsweek.

Nora Sayre of The New York Times reviewed the film in 1975 stating, "Oddly enough, the references to the nineteen-fifties, which seemed dated and rather ponderous in 1965, don't make the film appear old-fashioned now. Admittedly, one then saw it in an unfortunate context – draped in the mystique of the underground, when a number of inferior films employed some similar imagery, such as the juxtaposition of Christ and hipsters, or close-ups of all-purpose skulls. But after a decade's education in put-ons, one can savor the impudent freshness of "Scorpio" today."

Legacy
Directors Gaspar Noé and Nicolas Winding Refn cited Scorpio Rising as an influence on their filmmaking.

In 2022, the film was selected for preservation in the United States National Film Registry by the Library of Congress as being "culturally, historically, or aesthetically significant".

In popular culture
 "Scorpio Rising" is the title of the fifth track on Adam Ant's third album, Vive Le Rock. The lyrics reference "four young men" similar to Scorpio, with "leather jackets" and "big packets".
 The third album by British electronica band Death in Vegas takes its name from the film.
 The video for Matthew Dear's "Her Fantasy", directed by Tommy O'Haver is an homage to "Scorpio Rising".
 In 2012, the band Peggy Sue released a cover album of 12 of 14 songs from the film's soundtrack.

See also
List of American films of 1963

References

External links
 
 
 Scorpio Rising - The film on Ubu

1960s avant-garde and experimental films
1963 films
American independent films
American LGBT-related short films
Films directed by Kenneth Anger
LGBT-related controversies in film
Obscenity controversies in film
Outlaw biker films
1963 LGBT-related films
Films set in New York City
Films shot in New York City
1960s American films
United States National Film Registry films